Metaproscaline, or 3,4-dimethoxy-5-propoxyphenethylamine, is a lesser-known psychedelic drug.  It is an analog of proscaline. Metaproscaline was first synthesized by Alexander Shulgin. In his book PiHKAL (Phenethylamines i Have Known And Loved), the dosage and the duration are unknown. Metaproscaline produces few to no effects. Very little data exists about the pharmacological properties, metabolism, and toxicity of metaproscaline.

See also 

 Proscaline
 Mescaline
 Psychedelics, dissociatives and deliriants

References 

Psychedelic phenethylamines